Abarsij (also Romanized as Abarsīj; also known as Abarsaj, Abarsej, and Abrsaj) is a village in Kharqan Rural District, Bastam District, Shahrud County, Semnan Province, Iran. At the 2006 census, its population was 1,193, in 341 families.

References 

Populated places in Shahrud County